The 1917 Salford North by-election was held on 2 November 1917.  The by-election was held due to the death of the incumbent Liberal MP, Sir William Byles.  It was won by the Independent Labour Party candidate Ben Tillett.

References

1917 elections in the United Kingdom
1917 in England
1910s in Lancashire
Politics of Salford
By-elections to the Parliament of the United Kingdom in Greater Manchester constituencies
By-elections to the Parliament of the United Kingdom in Lancashire constituencies